"Blood and Water" is the title of a song, included as the A-side of a 7" single by the British band Palm Springs. The song was originally released in 2007 as a single-sided, ultra-limited edition 7" single commemorating the 1000th edition of Wolfgang Doebeling’s Roots radio show on Berlin's Radio Eins.

In December 2008, "Blood And Water" was released as a 7" single by the Berlin record label Rank Records.

The single is unique in that it's the only Palm Springs record not released on Randoms Acts Of Vinyl.

Notes

2008 singles
Palm Springs (band) songs
2008 songs